David Jebb was the engineer in charge of the construction of the Boyne Navigation, a series of canals running 31 km (19 mi) roughly parallel to the River Boyne from Oldbridge to Navan in County Meath, in Ireland. Jebb himself built a flour mill at Slane in 1766 to take advantage of the navigation that he had recently completed that far.

References

Irish engineers
18th-century Irish engineers
Year of birth missing
Year of death missing
18th-century Irish scientists